Lipinia septentrionalis is a species of skink. It is endemic to New Guinea and is found in both Western New Guinea (Indonesia) and in Papua New Guinea.

References

Lipinia
Endemic fauna of New Guinea
Reptiles of Western New Guinea
Reptiles of Papua New Guinea
Reptiles described in 2000
Taxa named by Rainer Günther
Skinks of New Guinea